Ghazi Shami is a Palestinian-American music technologist, record producer, audio engineer, entrepreneur, CEO and founder of Empire Distribution. Empire Distribution was founded in 2010 in San Francisco, California. Empire Distribution has offices in New York, Nashville, the UK and the Middle East.

Early life
Shami graduated from the College of San Mateo with an associate's degree in music technology. He has a bachelor's degree in radio and television from San Francisco State University.

Career
In 1995, he worked as an audio engineer for 3rd Eye Studios. 
Shami's music label has produced music for 50 Cent, XXXTentacion, Benny the Butcher, Hayley Kiyoko, Nef the Pharaoh, The Foreign Exchange, Rapper Big Pooh, Keak Da Sneak, Kendrick Lamar, and others.

In 2000, he worked as a creative media manager for Audiohighway.com.
Shami has jump started careers for Kendrick Lamar, Migos, Cardi B, and Anderson .Paak.

In 2010, Ghazi started Empire Distribution. 

In February 2021, Ghazi opened up a US division in the U.S. focussing on marketing in West Asia, North Africa, and the African Diaspora.

In 2022, Ghazi partnered with Claude Vonstroke to expand Empire's business into dance culture. Vonstroke is the CEO and founder of independent electronic music label Dirtybird Records. Vonstroke also releases music via his legal name, Barclay Crenshaw. Dirtybird was acquired by Empire in 2022.

In 2022, Ghazi started Empire in Africa.

External links
 Ghazi Shami: On shaking up the music distribution industry 
 Ghazi Shami - Interview

References

 
21st-century American businesspeople
Record producers
Hip hop record producers
Living people
Year of birth missing (living people)